Lac du Pourtet is a lake in Hautes-Pyrénées, France. At an elevation of 2420 m, its surface area is 0.058 km².

Lakes of Hautes-Pyrénées